Gadolinium Gallium Garnet (GGG) is a synthetic crystalline material of the garnet group, with good mechanical, thermal, and optical properties. It is typically colorless. It has a cubic lattice, a density of 7.08 g/cm3 and its Mohs hardness is variously noted as 6.5 and 7.5. Its crystals are produced with the Czochralski method. During production, various dopants can be added for colour modification. The material is also used in fabrication of various optical components and as a substrate material for magneto–optical films (magnetic bubble memory). It also finds use in jewelry as a diamond simulant. GGG can also be used as a seed substrate for the growth of other garnets such as yttrium iron garnet.

See also
 Micro-pulling-down
 Terbium gallium garnet
 Yttrium aluminium garnet

References

Synthetic minerals
Oxides
Gallium compounds
Gadolinium compounds
Diamond simulants